Jörg Ziercke (born 18 July 1947) served as the chief commissioner of the Federal Criminal Police Office of Germany (Bundeskriminalamt) from 2004 to 2014.

Career

Jörg Ziercke entered police service with the Bereitschaftspolizei in 1967.

From 1970 onwards, Ziercke worked as a criminal investigator with the state investigations bureau (Landeskriminalamt) in Kiel.

In 1979 he became the chief of the Neumünster investigations department (Kriminalpolizei).

From 1985 up until his appointment as head of the Bundeskriminalamt, he worked in leading positions within the police of the state of Schleswig-Holstein.

Personal life

Jörg Ziercke is married and has two children. He is a member of the SPD.

References
 Official biography
 Jörg Ziercke in Spiegel Magazine
 Jörg Ziercke in Time Magazine
 Jörg Ziercke in Bild Magazine

External links
 Federal Criminal Police Office of Germany - Official Site  -  -  - 

1947 births
Living people
People from Lübeck
German police chiefs